Karena is a given name. Notable people with the given name include:

Karena Chapman, Australian chemist
Karena Evans (born 1995), Canadian music video director and actress
Karena Johnson, British theatrical director and producer
Karena Lam (born 1978), Taiwanese-Canadian, actress and singer
Karena Ng (born 1993), Hong Kong actress and model.
Karena Richardson (born 1959), British figure skater